The 1998 ICF World Junior Canoe Slalom Championships were the 7th edition of the ICF World Junior Canoe Slalom Championships. The event took place in Lofer, Austria from 17 to 19 July 1998 under the auspices of the International Canoe Federation (ICF).

Seven medal events took place. The C2 team event was not held at these championships.

Medal summary

Men

Canoe

Kayak

Women

Kayak

Medal table

References

External links
International Canoe Federation

ICF World Junior Canoe Slalom Championships
ICF World Junior and U23 Canoe Slalom Championships